There are several video games based on the manga and anime series Case Closed, also known as  by Gosho Aoyama. The games primarily revolve around Jimmy Kudo along with his friends as they solve murders in an episodic fashion to a whodunit fashion. The games have been released on home and handheld game consoles. The series are usually Graphic adventure games.

The first game to be released from the Case Closed series was Meitantei Conan: Chika Yuuenchi Satsujin Jiken, which debuted on December 27, 1996 and the latest release being Meitantei Konan: Fantomu Kyōshikyoku (Rapusodī), which was released on April 17, 2014. In total, there are 24 games holding the Case Closed title. All but one of the games have been released only in Japan. Nobilis has localized Case Closed: The Mirapolis Investigation for the PAL region.

Games

Handheld console

Home console

References

Video games
Case Closed (video game series)
Case Closed (Video game series)
Video game franchises introduced in 1996
Lists of video games by franchise
Video games based on anime and manga
Detective video games